Restore Trust is a British heritage advocacy group which seeks to voice the concerns of supporters and friends of the National Trust over its perceived left-wing politicisation. The group has aimed to bring resolutions to the National Trust AGM in an effort to "restore the trust to its core purpose", and has criticised the National Trust's work on rewilding and social inclusion. To this end they have encouraged disaffected members to renew their membership in order to vote on resolutions to effect change.

The group's directors include Zewditu Gebreyohanes and Neil Record, chairman of the right-wing think tank the Institute of Economic Affairs.

AGM resolutions
In 2022, Restore Trust attempted to get two members resolutions passed at the National Trust AGM. Firstly, to abolish the Chairman's discretionary proxy vote, and secondly to create an independent office of Ombudsman 'to ensure the national trust remains accountable to its supporters'. Restore Trust also encouraged its supporters to vote for candidates from its proposed list which included historians Jeremy Black, conservative historian and activist Zareer Masani, and Stephen Green of the Christian Voice advocacy group. In response to the campaign, the National Trust's director of communications, Celia Richardson, said that she found the idea of "paid-for canvassing for places on our council" to be a "new and concerning" development.

Restore Trust did not get enough votes at the National Trust's annual general meeting in November 2022 to have its candidates elected, nor to pass its resolution's on the National Trust's governance. 

Restore Trust director, Zewditu Gebreyohanes, blamed this result on the AGM's optional "Quick Vote" system, which allowed voters to cast a single vote agreeing with all preferences of the trustees, rather than voting on each issue separately. Gebreyohanes felt that the option had been introduced "surreptitiously" and claimed that the Quick Vote results had not been made public, a decision that she felt was "suspicious". The National Trust issued a statement saying that the Quick Vote option was introduced at the advice of an independent election services provider and was considered to be "best practice", used by many other member organisations, and had been explained in voting instructions sent to members in the summer.

References 

Advocacy groups in the United Kingdom
Right-wing politics in the United Kingdom